Michalis Bastakos (born 27 July 1996) is a Greek professional footballer who plays as a striker.

References

1996 births
Living people
Greek footballers
Greece youth international footballers
Super League Greece players
Football League (Greece) players
Super League Greece 2 players
Atromitos F.C. players
Iraklis Thessaloniki F.C. players
Aris Thessaloniki F.C. players
Panachaiki F.C. players
Apollon Larissa F.C. players
Association football forwards
Footballers from Kalamata